Dennis Bernard Amos (April 16, 1923 – May 15, 2003) was a British born American immunologist. National Academies Press called Amos "one of the most distinguished scientists of the genetics of individuality of the twentieth century".
In 1969, Amos and Dr. David Hume founded the first regional organ sharing program in the United States.
Amos made significant contributions in immunogenetics, tumor immunity, and transplantation immunology.

Awards and distinctions 
Amos was president of the American Association of Immunologists, president and founder of the International Transplantation Society, and the co-founder and editor-in-chief of the journal Human Immunology.
Amos was elected to the National Academies of Science.
He received the 3M Award from FASEB, the Rose Payne Award for Distinguished Science by the American Society for Histocompatibility and Immunogenetics, and the National Institutes of Health Research Career Award.
He was awarded the Golding Bird Prize in Bacteriology as well as the Leonard Luubock Gold Medal.
Amos was professor of immunology and experimental surgery at Duke University from 1962 to 1993.

Life and career 
Amos was born April 16, 1923, in Bromley, Kent, England. He earned his B.S. and M.B from Chelsea Polytechnic and his M.D. from Guy's Hospital Medical School in 1963.

References

External links
D. Bernard Amos Papers at Duke University Medical Center Archives
Edmond J. Yunis, "D. Bernard Amos", Biographical Memoirs of the National Academy of Sciences (2004)

1923 births
2003 deaths
American immunologists
Duke University faculty
British emigrants to the United States
Members of the United States National Academy of Sciences
People from Bromley
People from Durham, North Carolina